Svenstorp is a locality in Ängelholm Municipality, Skåne County, Sweden. It had 239 inhabitants in 2010.

References 

Populated places in Ängelholm Municipality
Populated places in Skåne County